Faces of Death is the debut studio album by American hip hop group B.O.N.E. Enterpri$e. The album was originally released in 1993 on Stoney Burke, the independent label of Kermit Henderson, a record store owner in Cleveland who helped the band to record the album. The first track, titled "Flow Motion," was performed over the phone by member, Krayzie Bone, leading to all 4 members meeting up with Eazy-E getting them signed. A digitally remastered version was released in 1995 after the band had signed with Eazy-E and changed their name to Bone Thugs-n-Harmony.

The album introduced the band's unique new style of rapping in harmony, alternating singing and rapping, with layered harmonies of spoken rap.

Track listing

References

Bone Thugs-n-Harmony albums
Horrorcore albums
1993 debut albums